Razgah (also Romanized as Razgāh and Rāzgāh) is a village in Alan Baraghush Rural District, Mehraban District, Sarab County, East Azerbaijan Province, Iran. At the 2006 census, its population was 164, in 39 families.

References 

Populated places in Sarab County